Inka Grings (born 31 October 1978) is a German former international footballer who played as a striker. She played sixteen years for FCR 2001 Duisburg before joining FC Zürich Frauen. She also played for the Germany national team. Grings is the second all-time leading goalscorer in Germany's top division, the Frauen-Bundesliga, with 195 goals and claimed the league's top-scorer award for a record six seasons. Playing for Germany, she was the top-scorer at two UEFA European Championships. Grings was named Women's Footballer of the Year (Germany) in 1999, 2009 and 2010.

She is the manager of Switzerland national team after previously coaching FC Zürich Frauen in the Swiss national league.

Early life
As a child, Grings wanted to be a tennis player. However, after no tennis club had accepted her, she instead started playing football at TSV Eller 04 in 1984. She later played for Garather SV.

Club career

Duisburg, 1995–2011
Grings signed with FCR 2001 Duisburg in 1995. She quickly became an important player for the club and in the following years one of the most successful goalscorers in Germany. In 1998, Grings won the German Cup, her first major title. She scored three goals in the final against FSV Frankfurt. The following year in the 1998–99 season she became the Bundesliga's top-scorer for the first time. Grings was named Women's Footballer of the Year (Germany) in 1999 by the country's sports journalists.

Over the next decade, Grings became the Bundesliga all-time leading goalscorer, hitting the mark of 350 goals in January 2011. She won the Bundesliga title with Duisburg in the 1999–00 season; that year she also set the all-time record for goals in a Bundesliga season by scoring 38 goals. She won the German Cup on two more occasions in 2009 and 2010, and lifted the UEFA Women's Cup in the 2008–09 season. Grings was the Bundesliga top-scorer for three years in a row from 2008 to 2010 and was again voted Women's Footballer of the Year (Germany) in 2009 and 2010.

FC Zürich, 2011–13
She ended her contract at Duisburg one year early in an agreement with the club and announced transferring to an international club. On 1 September 2011 she joined Swiss side FC Zürich Frauen. In the first season she won the championship as well as the cup.

Chicago Red Stars, 2013

In May 2013, Grings signed with the Chicago Red Stars for the inaugural season of the National Women's Soccer League in the United States alongside Sonja Fuss. On 4 August 2013, she scored a brace against Seattle Reign FC helping the Red Stars win 3–1.
Grings was on the starting lineup in 14 of the 16 games in which she played for the Red Stars and scored three goals on the season. The Red Stars finished the 2013 season sixth in the standings with an 8–6–8 record.

She was waived by the Red Stars in September 2013.

International career

Grings made her debut for the Germany national team in May 1996 against Finland. She appeared for Germany at the 1999 FIFA Women's World Cup, scoring three goals. However, Germany was eliminated in the quarter-final. At the 2000 Summer Olympics, she won the bronze medal with the German team, scoring once against Australia in the group stage. Grings' career, particularly at international level, has repeatedly been affected by injuries. She missed the 2001 European Championship on home soil and the 2003 FIFA Women's World Cup due to injury. When she tore the anterior cruciate ligament in her knee shortly before the 2004 Summer Olympics, Grings initially announce to end her career. However, she changed her mind during physical therapy.

With four goals, Grings was the top-scorer at the 2005 European Championship, when Germany claimed its sixth European title. At the 2007 FIFA Women's World Cup and the 2008 Summer Olympics, Grings was not part of the German squad, because of disagreements with head coach Silvia Neid. She returned for Germany at the 2009 European Championship, claiming her second European title. With five goals Grings again was the tournament's top-scorer. She has been called up for the 2011 FIFA Women's World Cup.

Grings has scored 64 international goals and is ranked third behind Birgit Prinz (128) and Heidi Mohr (83) for Germany's all-time top goalscorers. During 93 appearances, she has averaged 0.69 goals per games, which makes her the team's second most prolific scorer.

Personal life
Grings is openly bisexual, she had a well publicized relationship with women's team colleague Linda Bresonik, and also dated male Holger Fach, former head coach of VfL Wolfsburg.

Career statistics

International
Scores and results list Germany's goal tally first, score column indicates score after each Grings goal.

Goals by competition

Matches and goals scored at World Cup and Olympic tournaments
Inka Grings competed in two FIFA Women's World Cup:
USA 1999,
and Germany 2011;
one Olympics:
Sydney 2000;
played in 13 matches and scored 6 goals. Along with her Germany team, Grings is a bronze medalist from Sydney 2000.

Honours
FCR 2001 Duisburg
 Bundesliga: 1999–00; runner-up (7) 1996–97, 1998–99, 2004–05, 2005–06, 2006–07, 2007–08, 2009–10
 German Cup: 1997–98, 2008–09, 2009–10; runner-up 1998–99, 2002–03, 2006–07
 UEFA Women's Cup: 2008–09

FC Zürich Frauen
Nationalliga A: 2012, 2013
Swiss Women's Cup: 2012, 2013

Germany
 UEFA European Championship: 2005, 2009
 Summer Olympic Games: Bronze medal 2000

Individual
 Women's Footballer of the Year (Germany): 1999, 2009, 2010
 Top-scorer Bundesliga (6): 1998–99, 1999–00, 2002–03, 2007–08, 2008–09, 2009–10
 Top-scorer UEFA Women's Championship: 2005, 2009
 Top-scorer UEFA Women's Champions League: 2010–11

See also 
 List of 2000 Summer Olympics medal winners
 List of UEFA Women's Championship goalscorers
 List of German women's football champions
 List of LGBT sportspeople

References

Match reports

External links

 
 
 Profile at the German Football Association 
 

1978 births
Living people
Footballers from Düsseldorf
Bisexual sportspeople
Bisexual women
German women's footballers
German expatriate women's footballers
Germany women's international footballers
Women's association football forwards
1. FC Köln (women) players
FCR 2001 Duisburg players
Chicago Red Stars players
National Women's Soccer League players
Association footballers' wives and girlfriends
German expatriate sportspeople in the United States
German expatriate sportspeople in Switzerland
Expatriate women's soccer players in the United States
Expatriate women's footballers in Switzerland
Olympic bronze medalists for Germany
Footballers at the 2000 Summer Olympics
Olympic medalists in football
1999 FIFA Women's World Cup players
2011 FIFA Women's World Cup players
German LGBT sportspeople
LGBT association football players
Medalists at the 2000 Summer Olympics
German women's football managers
MSV Duisburg managers
Olympic footballers of Germany
UEFA Women's Championship-winning players
FC Zürich Frauen players
Swiss Women's Super League players